Le Rêve is an 1891 opera by Alfred Bruneau to a libretto by Émile Zola based on the author's 1888 novel of the same name.

Roles

References

Operas
1891 operas
French-language operas
Operas by Alfred Bruneau
Operas set in France
Operas based on novels